Lloyd Cecil Allen (born May 8, 1950) is a former professional baseball pitcher, who played in Major League Baseball (MLB) for the California Angels (-), Texas Rangers (-), and Chicago White Sox (-). He was the first big league player born in the 1950s to appear in a regular-season game.

Early life
Allen was born in Merced, California. He attended Selma High School in Selma, California and Fresno City College.

Baseball career
Allen was selected by the California Angels with its first round (12th overall pick) of the 1968 amateur draft.

In 1969, Allen was the youngest player in the American League (AL). In 1971, his 15 saves ranked seventh in the AL. He was traded along with Jim Spencer from the Angels to the Texas Rangers for Mike Epstein, Rich Hand and Rick Stelmaszek on May 20, 1973. Arm problems led to him retiring from baseball, in 1979.

In seven MLB seasons, Allen had an 8–25 win–loss record, in 159 games, with 19 games started, 22 saves,  innings pitched, 291 hits allowed, 183 runs allowed, 155 earned runs allowed, 19 home runs allowed, 196 walks, 194 strikeouts, 11 hit batsmen, 27 wild pitches, 18 intentional walks, and a 4.69 earned run average (ERA).

References

External links

1950 births
Baseball players from California
California Angels players
Chicago White Sox players
Denver Bears players
El Paso Sun Kings players
Hawaii Islanders players
Idaho Falls Angels players
Iowa Oaks players
Jewish American baseball players
Jewish Major League Baseball players
Living people
Major League Baseball pitchers
People from Merced, California
San Jose Bees players
Texas Rangers players
Tulsa Oilers (baseball) players
21st-century American Jews